During World War II, the United States Army Air Forces (USAAF) established numerous air facilities in Louisiana for antisubmarine defense in the Gulf of Mexico and for training pilots and aircrews of USAAF fighters and bombers. The larger facilities were Army Air Bases (AAB) while the Army Air Fields ( AAFld) were lesser facilities. The map below shows both types as AAB and AAF.

Most of these air facilities were under the command of Third Air Force or the Army Air Forces Training Command (AAFTC) (A predecessor of the current-day United States Air Force Air Education and Training Command).  In addition, the Air Technical Service Command (ATSC) commanded a significant number of airfields in a support roles.

It is still possible to find remnants of these wartime airfields. Many were converted into municipal airports, some were returned to agriculture and several were retained as United States Air Force installations and were front-line bases during the Cold War. Hundreds of the temporary buildings that were used survive today, and are being used for other purposes.

Major airfields 
Air Technical Service Command
 Moisant Army Airfield, Kenner
 Sub-base of Naval Air Station New Orleans, Joint Use
 Now: Louis Armstrong New Orleans International Airport

 Harding Field, Baton Rouge
 49th Base Headquarters and Air Base Squadron
 Now: Baton Rouge Metropolitan Airport

 New Orleans Army Air Base, New Orleans
 37th Base Headquarters and Air Base Squadron
 Now: New Orleans Lakefront Airport

Third Air Force
 Alexandria Army Air Field, Alexandria
 517th Base Headquarters and Air Base Squadron
 Later: England Air Force Base (1950-1992)
 Now: Alexandria International Airport

 Esler Field, Pineville
 333d Air Base Group
 Now: Esler Regional Airport

 Lake Charles Army Air Field, Lake Charles
 Gulf Coast Training Center, 1942
 82d Base Headquarters and Air Base Squadron
 Later: Lake Charles/Chennault Air Force Base (1950-1963)
 Now: Chennault International Airport

 DeRidder Army Air Base, DeRidder
 317th Base Headquarters and Air Base Squadron
 Now: Beauregard Regional Airport

Army Air Forces Training CommandAAF Southeast Training Center
 Barksdale Field, Shreveport
 5th Base Headquarters and Air Base Squadron
 Flying Training, HQ AAF Training Command
 Now:  Barksdale Air Force Base

 Selman Field, Monroe
 329th Base Headquarters and Air Base Squadron
 Now: Monroe Regional Airport

References

 Maurer, Maurer (1983). Air Force Combat Units Of World War II. Maxwell AFB, Alabama: Office of Air Force History. .
 Ravenstein, Charles A. (1984). Air Force Combat Wings Lineage and Honors Histories 1947-1977. Maxwell AFB, Alabama: Office of Air Force History. .
 Thole, Lou (1999), Forgotten Fields of America : World War II Bases and Training, Then and Now - Vol. 2.  Pictorial Histories Pub . 
 Military Airfields in World War II - Louisiana

External links

 01
World War II
World War II
World War II
Airfields of the United States Army Air Forces in the United States by state
United States World War II army airfields